Giovanni Abagnale (born 11 January 1995) is an Italian rower. He competed in the men's coxless pair event at the 2016 Summer Olympics. and the coxless Pair at the 2020 Summer Olympics.

He won a silver medal at the 2017 World Rowing Championships in the coxless four. Abagnale is an athlete of the Gruppo Sportivo della Marina Militare.

References

External links
 

1995 births
Living people
Italian male rowers
Olympic rowers of Italy
Rowers at the 2016 Summer Olympics
Medalists at the 2016 Summer Olympics
Olympic bronze medalists for Italy
Olympic medalists in rowing
World Rowing Championships medalists for Italy
Rowers of Marina Militare
Rowers at the 2020 Summer Olympics
20th-century Italian people
21st-century Italian people